Gedo (Maay: Gethy,  or Ghedu) is an administrative region (gobol) in Jubaland, southern Somalia. Its regional capital is Garbahaarreey. It was created in 1974 and is bordered by the Ogaden in Ethiopia, the North Eastern Province in Kenya, and the Somali regions of Bakool, Bay, Jubbada Dhexe (Middle Juba), and Jubbada Hoose (Lower Juba) further down east. The southern parts of Gedo, west of the Jubba River, used to be part of the old British Trans-Juba region during half of the seventy years of colonial era in Africa from 1890 to 1960. The British and Italians fought twice over this area. The first democratically elected governor of the administrative region was Hussein Farey, who entered office in 2008.

The regional capital is Garbaharey. The Marehan (Darod) dominate economically, politically, and militarily, rules across all districts.

The Marehan in Gedo are split between the guri ('original inhabitants') and the galti ('new settlers'). Guri-Galti conflicts over power and resources are common, especially in Luuq, Belet Hawo, and Baardhere.

Garbaharrey was the last refuge of deposed President Mohammed Siad Barre in early 1991, before he left the country for Nairobi and exile. After 1991, the Somali National Front under Marehan Omar Haji Masale held large parts of the region for many years. The militant religious group al-Itihaad al-Islamiya (AIAI) also rose to power in the region later in the 1990s, taking Luuq as its headquarters. The Ethiopian National Defence Force then entered the area to attack AIAI's bases in 1996, and the Marehan clans split, either supporting or opposing the Ethiopian forces. A peace conference to resolve the intra-Marehan disagreements was convened in 2004.

Districts

Gedo Region consists of six districts:

El Wak District
Bardhere District
Balet Hawo District
Doolow District
Garbahaarreey District
Luuq District

Buurdhuubo District has also been claimed as a seventh district.

Major rivers in the Gedo region include the Dawa and the Jubba.

Education
The city of Garbahaarreey and the regions two ancient cities of Luuq and Bardera had education systems up to secondary level. There were some technical schools in Bardera and Garbaharreey, albeit without curriculum. They are connected through the Gedo Education Committee. All of Gedo region's high school graduates attended the Somali National University or affiliated institutions in Mogadishu.

Since the civil war in Somalia, Gedo became one of half dozen regions which have restarted higher education institutions in the country. Bardera Polytechnic, Gedo's first college, and University of Gedo, are both located in Bardera.

Demographics
According to a 1994 UNOSOM II estimate, the population of Gedo was about 590,000, the majority of the population being from the Marehan. Other estimates varied considerably; two reports by the United Nations Development Office for Somalia issued in the same year, 1995, gave very different estimates: 330,000 and about 1 million.

The United Nations Development Programme estimated the total in 2005 as 328,378; and UN estimates from 2014 stand at some 508,000.

Economy
The economy mostly depends on livestock and farming but the Gedo region has strong interregional and international cross-border trade with Kenya and some extent with Ethiopia. Trade between Somalia, Kenya and Ethiopia allowed the Gedo region to be economically stable for the years before the UN intervention and afterwards. The 1998 Nordic Fact Finding Mission prepared a report in Gedo region and found some encouraging economic figures. Davidson College assistant professor Ken Menkhaus said that "Traders in Gedo region made more profit than, for instance, those in Hargeisa, in north-western Somalia." Trade going through the border between the three countries were ongoing despite the raging civil war in Somalia for much of the 1990.

Government
Gedo region has a 32-member assembly body. The members are directly elected from the seven districts of the region with proportionality according to district population. The Gedo assembly or (Gollaha Gobalka Gedo) works with the federal government based in Mogadishu. Regional level posts include:

 Governor
 Vice Governor 
 Inter-Regional Affairs Director
 Director of Security Services
 Gedo Regional Police Commander
 Director of Education Services
 Director of Agricultural Agency
 Director of Economic Affairs
 Livestock and Forestry Dept. Director
 Director of Justice and Religious Affairs

After long conflicts in the region, the regional elders started a peace conference with initiatives from the then governor, Aden Ibrahim Aw Hirsi. This effort ended in success. and were followed by the elections of the regional assembly. The process was financed by UNDP.

In addition to regional posts, the Federal Government of Somalia maintains military forces in the region. Brigade 9 of Division 60 (Somalia) was reported in the region as of 2016, originating from a U.S.-funded pilot programme began in 2012.

Cities and towns
Bardera and Beled Haawo cities are the two principal cities of the Gedo region. In the recent past, Luuq or Lugh used to be the main political city of Gedo Region but the Somali Civil War made many of the city's residents to flee to other towns.

Bardera, the largest city and the seat of the most populous district in Gedo, has become urbanized to the extent that its population multiplied 400% since the breakdown of law and order in the capital of the country, Mogadishu. Aside from the urban population in proper Bardera, the rest of the region's population are pastoralists with the exception of people living in the cities where the region's seven district seats are located. The town is home to Bardera Polytechnic as well as the University of Gedo which also has a campus at Beled Haawo.

Adayle
Anoole
Daar
Mardhaa
Bardera
Barwaaqo
Beled Haawo
Banaaney
Bilcisha
Boorame
Buraa
Boore
Buulo Mareer
Buurdhuubo
Buusaar
Caanoole
Cinjirta
Caracase
Ceel Cadde

Ceel Duur
Ceel Gaduud
Ceel Waaq
Dhamasa or Dhamaso
Dheenle
Dhuusaay
Doolow
Calijiciir
El Mergis
Fafahdun
Faan Weyn
Gantamaa
Garbahaarreey
Gedweyne
Gerileey
Gosoweyna

Hareeri
Kurmaan
Luuq
Malmaleey	
Mudulow
madhawey
Qooneey
Shaatooloow
Siidimo
Uunsi
Gus waran
Eeykiintuuri
Uar Esgudud
Xamara
Yurkud

Notes

References
 October 1998 Nordic Fact-Finding Mission to the Gedo Region of Somalia

External links

Administrative Map of Gedo
Administrative Map of Gedo with villages

 
Regions of Somalia